Chekhovo is the name of several rural localities in Russia:
Chekhovo, Irkutsk Oblast, a selo in Nizhneudinsky District of Irkutsk Oblast
Chekhovo, Kaliningrad Oblast, a settlement in Gvardeysky Rural Okrug of Bagrationovsky District of Kaliningrad Oblast
Chekhovo, Smolensk Oblast, a village in Kikinskoye Rural Settlement of Tyomkinsky District of Smolensk Oblast
Chekhovo, Tver Oblast, a village in Rameshkovsky District of Tver Oblast

See also
Chekhov (disambiguation)
Chekhovsky (disambiguation)